Naba Kishore Das (7 January 1962 – 29 January 2023) was an Indian politician who was a member of Odisha Legislative Assembly from 2009 until his death, representing Jharsuguda. Originally a member of the Indian National Congress, he later switched to Biju Janata Dal.

Political career
Das was a member of Biju Janata Dal in Odisha politics. Earlier, he was in the Indian National Congress. Das was elected to the 14th Odisha Legislative Assembly with 62,663 votes. He was then elected to the 15th Odisha Legislative Assembly for his second term. He was also elected to the 16th Odisha Legislative Assembly for the third consecutive term. At the time of his death, he served as the state's Minister of Health and Family Welfare.

Death
On 29 January 2023, a policeman of ASI (Assistant sub-inspector) rank, fired four or five bullets on Das as he stepped out of his car at Gandhi square. The incident took place in Brajarajnagar, Jharsuguda district, when the minister was on his way to attend a meeting. He later died whilst undergoing treatment at Apollo hospital in Bhubaneswar. The Odisha Government ordered an inquiry into the incident. Then the crime branch took the accused policeman to the neighbouring Sundargargh district, where senior officers, including ADG Arun Bothra, questioned him. 

"Health Minister Naba Das was admitted to Apollo with gunshot wounds to the left chest. A team of doctors led by Dr Debashish Nayak immediately attended to and operated on him. During the operation, it was found that a single bullet had entered and exited the body, injuring the heart and left lung and causing massive internal bleeding and injury. The injuries were repaired, and steps were taken to improve the pumping of the heart. He was given urgent ICU care. But despite best efforts, he could not be revived and succumbed to his injuries," the statement read.

A 3-day state mourning was declared in Odisha. According to an official statement from the Odisha government, the national flag flew at half-mast on the day of death and on the day of the funeral.

References

1962 births
2023 deaths
Biju Janata Dal politicians
Indian National Congress politicians from Odisha
Odisha MLAs 2019–2024
Odisha MLAs 2014–2019
Odisha MLAs 2009–2014
21st-century Indian politicians
Assassinated Indian politicians
People from Jharsuguda district
Deaths by firearm in India